The 2005–06 Kent Football League season was the 40th in the history of Kent Football League a football competition in England.

League table

The league featured 15 clubs which competed in the previous season, along with one new club:
Erith & Belvedere, relegated from the Southern League

League table

References

External links

2005-06
9